John England (born 1 June 1940) is a New Zealand cricketer. He played in six first-class matches for Canterbury from 1958 to 1962.

See also
 List of Canterbury representative cricketers

References

External links
 

1940 births
Living people
New Zealand cricketers
Canterbury cricketers
Cricketers from Christchurch